ICGS Samrat (CG47) is an Indian Coast Guard Advanced Off Shore Patrol Vessel (OPV), second ship of  which has been indigenously designed and built by Goa Shipyard Limited.  The vessel was commissioned to coast guard service on 21 January 2009 by Former Defence Minister A. K. Antony. Samrat is based in Goa and will be extensively used for Exclusive Economic Zone and other duties as it is set to be exploited extensively on the Western Seaboard.

Service history
Samrat has made several visits to various countries as part of its bilateral efforts to promote goodwill, which are aimed at enhancing cooperation with Maritime Law Enforcement Agencies. On 2 December 2012, Samrat led by Deputy Inspector-General Mukesh Purohit, of the Indian Coast Guard, with 22 officers and 115 sailors on board, anchored at Ho Chi Minh City port, began a 5-day friendly visit to Vietnam. A reception ceremony was held at the port with the participation of representatives from the Ho Chi Minh City People’s Committee, Vietnam Marine Police Department, the External Relations Department under the Ministry of National Defence, the High Command of Military Zone 7 and the Indian Ambassador to Vietnam.

On 21 October 2015, as part of goodwill visit to the South East Asian region, in the first-leg of the overseas deployment, ICGS Samrat made a port-call at the Port of Macassar, Indonesia. The visit was aimed at enhancing cooperation with the Maritime Law Enforcement Agencies of Indonesia, including BAKAMLA and BASARNAS, and discussing ways to combat maritime transnational crime, maritime search and rescue, maritime law enforcement, exclusive economic zone surveillance, humanitarian aid and disaster relief and maritime pollution response.

Joint exercise
In 2014, Samrat took part in the 13th joint exercise between Coast Guards of India and Japan held annually since 1999 titled Sahayog- Kaijin 2014. JCG (Japan Coast Guard Ship) Mizuho and its integral helicopter,  HAL Chetak helicopter, Dornier 228 aircraft and  ICGS C-404 also took part in the exercise which focuses on anti piracy procedures, pollution control measures and other areas of common professional interest.

See also
Sankalp-class offshore patrol vessel
ICGS Vishwast

References

Ships of the Indian Coast Guard